Sabinal, originally San Antonio de Sabinal, is a populated place in Socorro County, New Mexico, United States.

History 
San Antonio de Sabinal was founded in 1741 as one of several frontier settlements along a road that paralleled the Camino Real de Tierra Adentro along the west bank of the Rio Grande, south of Pueblo of Isleta.

References 

Unincorporated communities in Socorro County, New Mexico
Populated places in Socorro County, New Mexico